William Malbank, 1st Baron of Wich Malbank (c.1050 – before 1109) was a baron who travelled to Nantwich in Cheshire, England, and built a castle there. He also founded the Hospital of St Nicholas there in 1083–84.

References

Sources
Hall J. A History of the Town and Parish of Nantwich, or Wich Malbank, in the County Palatine of Chester (2nd edn) (E. J. Morten; 1972)

Nantwich